Man in Black: His Own Story in His Own Words is a 1975 autobiography by country musician Johnny Cash. It served as part of the basis for the 2005 film Walk the Line.

First edition
Grand Rapids: Zondervan, 1975. 

1975 non-fiction books
Autobiographies adapted into films
Music autobiographies
Johnny Cash